Matías Oyola (born 15 October 1982 in Río Cuarto) is a retired
Argentine born Ecuadorian naturalized football player that used to play as a central midfielder.
Majority of his over 20 years of career, he spent it in Ecuador, being one of the most acclaimed and important players for Ecuadorian Serie A team Barcelona Sporting Club, where he spent over 12 years, making him an outstanding fixture, the backbone of the team in the past decade and beginning of the current one for such football institution.

Club career
Oyola came through the youth system at River Plate, in 2003 he was loaned to Defensores de Belgrano of the Argentine 2nd division until 2005.

In 2005 Oyola spent a season with Gimnasia y Esgrima de Jujuy before returning to River Plate in 2006. Oyola only made 3 first team appearances before his transfer to Belgrano de Córdoba in 2007.

At the end of the 2006–2007 season Belgrano were relegated and Oyola joined Independiente.

On 7 June 2009 "El Pony" joined the Ecuadorian giant Barcelona for the remainder of the season.

On 5 August 2009, Oyola scored his 1st goal with Barcelona from a splendid free kick.

International career
Oyola was born and raised in Argentina – but he transferred to Ecuador later in his career and got Ecuadorian citizenship. Boyola got his first call up to the senior Ecuador side for 2018 FIFA World Cup qualifiers against Chile and Bolivia in October 2016. Oyola made his debut for Ecuador in a 2–2 tie with the latter, coming on as a sub in the 78th minute.

Honors
Barcelona SC
Serie A (3): 2012, 2016, 2020

References

External links
 Argentine Primera statistics
 Football-Lineups player profile
 El Telegrafo

1982 births
Living people
People from Río Cuarto, Córdoba
Ecuadorian footballers
Ecuador international footballers
Argentine footballers
Ecuadorian people of Argentine descent
Sportspeople of Argentine descent
Argentine expatriate footballers
Association football wingers
Club Atlético River Plate footballers
Gimnasia y Esgrima de Jujuy footballers
Club Atlético Belgrano footballers
Club Atlético Independiente footballers
Club Atlético Colón footballers
Defensores de Belgrano footballers
Barcelona S.C. footballers
Argentine Primera División players
Expatriate footballers in Ecuador
Argentine emigrants to Ecuador
Naturalized citizens of Ecuador
Sportspeople from Córdoba Province, Argentina